The 2010 Women's Four Nations Cup was the second Hockey Four Nations Cup, an international women's field hockey tournament, consisting of a series of test matches. It was held in Germany, from June 25 to 27, 2010, and featured four of the top nations in women's field hockey.

Competition format
The tournament featured the national teams of Argentina, India, Ireland, and the hosts, Germany, competing in a round-robin format, with each team playing each other once. Three points will be awarded for a win, one for a draw, and none for a loss.

Officials
The following umpires were appointed by the International Hockey Federation to officiate the tournament:

 Stella Bartlema (NED)
 Lynn Cowie-McAlister (AUS)
 Michelle Meister (GER)
 Carol Metchette (IRE)
 Anupama Puchimanda (IND)

Results
All times are local (Central European Time).

Fixtures

Statistics

Goalscorers

References

External links
Tournament Website

2010
2010 in women's field hockey
field hockey
field hockey